The International Motorcycle Shows are a series of motorcycle expositions that take place across the United States. The shows are open to the public and feature new products, services as well as new-model motorcycles, custom bikes, ATVs, cruisers, concept bikes, vintage bikes, and scooters.  Progressive Insurance has been Title Sponsor since 2010.

Originally titled the Great American Motorcycle and ATV Shows, these events were launched by Great American Media, Inc. for the 1982 model season. After being acquired by Edgell Communications (now Advanstar Communications, Inc) in 1988, the shows have continued to grow. The 2005–2006 series attracted nearly 600,000 attendees and more than 17 leading manufacturers.

External links 

International Motorcycle Shows official site

Motorcycle shows
Informa brands
Recurring events established in 1982
1982 establishments in the United States